Nice Guy is the second studio album by American country musician Eric Paslay. The album was released via Paso Fino Records on August 14, 2020 and was produced by F. Reid Shippen and Eric Paslay.

Critical reception 
Nancy Kruh of People states that Paslay's "melodies teem with energy, and his lyrics are filled with poetic treasures and warmed by his supple voice".

Jessica Nicholson of MusicRow described the title track as "a tongue-in-cheek look at nice guys who finish last", while "Woman Like Her", penned with Charles Kelley and Laura Veltz, "pays tribute to lasting love".

Track listing 
"Heartbeat Higher" (featuring Sarah Buxton) – 3:38
"Boat in a Bottle" – 3:26
"I Took a Pill in Ibiza" – 4:58
"Off the Edge of the Summer" – 3:55
"Just Once" – 3:21
"Nice Guy" – 2:50
"Under Your Spell" – 3:16
"Fingertips" – 3:49
"Wild and Young" – 3:42
"Endless Summer Dream" – 3:24
"On This Side of Heaven" – 4:20
"Woman Like Her" – 4:24

References 

2020 albums
Eric Paslay albums